Gheorghe Șincai National College may refer to one of two educational institutions in Romania:

Gheorghe Șincai National College (Baia Mare)
Gheorghe Șincai National College (Bucharest)